Andrew Maxwell (born January 7, 1991) is an American football quarterback. He played college football at Michigan State. He was the Spartans starting quarterback in 2012.

Early life
Maxwell attended Midland High School in Midland, Michigan. He was also a letterman in track and field and basketball. Maxwell started for Midland at quarterback as a freshman and sophomore. As a junior, Maxwell lead the Chemics to the Division 2 state championship game, where they lost to Martin Luther King High School. He finished the season with 2,024 yardsfor 18 touchdowns. Maxwell was invited to attend the ESPN RISE Elite 11 Quarterback Camp. Maxwell committed to Michigan State on March 2, 2008.

College career

2009–2011 seasons
In 2009, Maxwell was redshirted. In 2010 and 2011, Maxwell was the backup to Kirk Cousins. In 2012, Maxwell started the entire season, before backing up Connor Cook in 2013.

Statistics
As of the conclusion of the 2013 season, Maxwell's statistics are as follows:

Professional career 
After being undrafted, Maxwell was invited to try out for the San Diego Chargers. He was not signed to a contract at the conclusion of the rookie minicamp.

References

External links
 Michigan State profile

1991 births
Living people
American football quarterbacks
Michigan State Spartans football players